Azusa Ono (小野 梓, Ono Azusa?; March 10, 1852 – January 11, 1886), was a Japanese intellectual, jurist and politician during the Meiji era. He was an advisor to Ōkuma Shigenobu and participated in debates on reforms and the drafting of a first constitution for Japan after the Meiji restoration of 1868 which saw the end of the shogun regime. Specialist in international law, Azusa Ono advocated the establishment of a parliamentary system based on respect for the rights of the people, inspired by the British model. He then played an important role in the founding of the Progressive Constitutional Party Rikken Kaishintō) and the creation of Waseda University.

Biography 
Azusa Ono was born in Sukumo, a small fishing village in Shikoku, into a family of well-to-do merchants who became samurai associate in the Tosa Domain. He served in the Boshin War (civil war) of 1868–1869. He left to study at Shōheikō in Tokyo, then in Osaka where he learned English in 1871. He went to the United States to study law before going to London from 1872 to 1974 to learn economics and the banking system. During this stay, he took the opportunity to travel to Europe and discover the different Western political systems.

Returning to Japan in Tokyo, in 1876, he obtained a post at the Ministry of Finance. He soon was given the responsibility of drafting a new civil code for the Ministry of Justice. His knowledge of international law earned him a rapid ascent in the hierarchy so that he quickly rubbed shoulders with various leaders of the Meiji era, including Ōkuma Shigenobu, minister of finance. The two men having similarities of views. In 1880 Azusa Ono was transferred in the same ministry and occupied an important position.

It was a political turning point in 1881 when the emperor decided to form a national assembly in Japan. Therefore, in 1882, Azusa Ono resigned with others from the administration and participated in the founding of a political party, the Rikken Kaishintō (Constitutional Progressive Party), around Ōkuma Shigenobu. He was active at all levels in the creation of the party and finally became its secretary general. It is no exaggeration to consider Ono Azusa as the "real" founder of the party, his role was so significant.

In 1982 Azusa Ono also assisted Ōkuma Shigenobu in the opening of an educational establishment in Tokyo senmon gakkō (specialized school of Tokyo), taking care of the administrative procedures and being president de facto of the establishment instead of umakuma Shigenobu. The school will become Waseda University. He died in 1886 at the age of 33 of chronic tuberculosis.

Political and intellectual positions 
In the 1870s and 1880s, there were many debates in Japan over the form of government the country was to adopt after the fall of the Tokugawa shogunate and the Meiji restoration strongly influenced by his stays abroad. Azusa Ono took part in the discussions and published numerous articles offering a point of view close to the British model.

This was put into action upon his return to Japan by the creating a group of young intellectuals named Kyōzon dōshū. They organized conferences, published an opinion journal and opened a public library. 
This group was displayed on the Society of Japanese Students which he had created in London during his studies with a countrywoman, Baba Tatsui. 
In an article of 1875, he wrote on the importance of the respect for the natural rights of the people and individual freedom. He strongly supported the abolition of torture in 1879

It mainly contributed to the images of the organization of the government and the writing of a constitution for Japan. Here again, its proximity to the British model was tangible. in its 1881 constitutional essay which he wrote together with Miyoshi Taizō and Iwasaki Taizō he proposed a parliament elected by the people, an upper house appointed by the emperor, a rigorous framework for state administration and also stressed the importance of the rights of the individual (using ideas from the United States Constitution).

He also upheld the importance of a unified ministerial cabinet and from political parties, replacing the territorial administration derived from feudal clans who ruled Japan for many centuries. In this sense, he strongly opposed the defenders of an oligarchic government linked to the big clans. and repeatedly criticized the feudal practices which he judged evil for the liberties of the people. Great defender of individual rights and freedom he therefore remained very close to western models. However, he also brought forth the dangers of forced westernization and rather favored reforms that kept the Japanese spirit, notably the central role of the emperor. This was also a reason why the French model, born of a particularly radical Revolution, did not have the preference of umakuma Shigenobu and Ono.

Ōkuma Shigenobu, eminent personality of the early Meiji era remains known among other things for his memory given to the emperor in 1881 who advocates the rapid establishment of a national assembly, the drafting of a constitution and the importance of political parties. 
The role of Azusa Ono has been debated in the writing of this important memoir which has received a favorable reception among the opinions and the emperor. However, there are many of the ideas discussed between Ono and Ōkuma Shigenobu.

See also 

Constitution of Japan
Politics of Japan

References

Japanese jurists
19th-century Japanese people
Japanese human rights activists
1852 births
1886 deaths
19th-century deaths from tuberculosis
Tuberculosis deaths in Japan